Fabius was an unincorporated community in Hardy County, West Virginia, United States.

The name Fabius supposedly is the English translation from Latin of the first name of Peter Bean, an early settler.

References 

Unincorporated communities in West Virginia
Unincorporated communities in Hardy County, West Virginia